Shapath is a 1997 Indian Hindi-language action film directed and produced by Rajiv Babbar, it stars Mithun Chakraborty, Jackie Shroff, Ramya Krishna, Vineetha in lead roles.

Plot
Shapath is an Action flick from Rajiv Babbar, who has produced several successful films with Mithun. The film had Jackie Shroff in an important role. The film also has Singer Altaf Raja in Special appearance.

Cast
 Mithun Chakraborty as Commando Arjun / Surya
 Jackie Shroff as Inspector Kishan
 Ramya Krishna as Inspector Kavita
 Vineetha as Shalu
 Rami Reddy as Minister Dindayal Kallu
 Raza Murad as Minister Rana Jung Bahadur
 Kader Khan as Chaurasia
 Shakti Kapoor as Constable Shakti Singh
 Ranjeet as Dr. Subramaniam Swami
 Gulshan Grover as Rajeshwar
 Salim Ghouse as Lankeshwar
 Harish Kumar as Rahul
 Achyut Potdar as Satyajeet 
 Deepak Shirke as Assistant Commissioner of Police
 Kareena Grover as Neena 
 Tina Ghai as Chameli
 Guddi Maruti as Sharmili Singh
 Rohit Dubey as Constable Sheroo

Soundtrack
The songs were composed by Anand–Milind and lyrics were penned by Sameer Anjaan
"Ishq Aur Pyar Ka Mazaa Lijiye" - Altaf Raja, Sonu Nigam Vinod Rathod
"Hai Bada Anari Rabba" - Udit Narayan, Alka Yagnik
"Chum Le Mere Baalon Ko" - Vinod Rathod, Poornima
"Chuski Chuski" - Udit Narayan
"Munde Bigad Gaye" - Udit Narayan, Vinod Rathod, Alka Yagnik
"Ishq Aur Pyar Ka Mazaa Lijiye" - Altaf Raja

References

External links
 

1997 films
1990s Hindi-language films
Mithun's Dream Factory films
Films shot in Ooty
Films scored by Anand–Milind
Indian action films